These are the official results of the Women's 1500 metres event at the 1992 Summer Olympics in Barcelona, Spain. There were a total of 43 participating athletes. The three qualifying heats were held on August 5, followed by the two semi-finals on August 6. The final was held on August 8, 1992.

This field was stacked with the world championship podium of Algerian Hassiba Boulmerka with Tetyana Dorovskikh and Lyudmila Rogachova, who had represented the Soviet Union, but after the demise of that political entity just over eight months earlier were representing the "Unified Team."  Other key competitors look to be '84 silver medalist / 800 metre gold medalist Doina Melinte, and the wild card of 800 meter specialist Maria Mutola moving up in distance.  Another wild card were two young Chinese athletes, 21 year old Liu Li and 19 year old Qu Yunxia who had qualified for the final.  While the Soviet Union had virtually owned the event for the previous two decades, the Chinese had no history in this event.  In the World Championships the previous year, the only, token, Chinese representative finished dead last in her qualifying heat.

This was not going to be a slow tactical final.  Rogachova went to the front, quickly marked by Melinte and a third former Soviet, double 1983 medalist Yekaterina Podkopayeva.  Left behind at the line, Liu rushed forward on the outside, chased by Boulmerka.  In dead last place, Qu had to work her way around PattiSue Plumer and Mutola who had dropped back expecting to pick up the pieces with her finishing kick.  Dorovskikh rushed to join the party at the front, followed by Qu who had a noticeably less refined running style, rocking from side to side, looking strained.  Boulmerka aggressively stuck behind Rogachova at the front, the only one to break up the Unified former Soviet bloc at the front of the pack.  700 metres into the race, Qu rocked her way past Melinte and Liu onto third place Podkopayeva's back.  As the two leaders started to break, Qu followed onto Boulmerka's back.  With a lap to go, the field had strung out.  Only the remaining green Unified team members were able to struggle to hold on to the three leaders with a gap back to Plummer and Mutola leading the second group.  As she was falling back through the field, Melinte walked off the track at the end of the third lap.  Mutola launched into what would be a long final kick, but after leaving Plummer, she wasn't making any headway.  Down the backstretch, Boulmerka made her one move, accelerating past Rogachova.  Rogachova couldn't answer, just holding her same speed.  Dorovskikh stuck to Qu's back and made her move for bronze off the final turn.  Qu looked at her and sprinted away gaining rapidly on Rogachova toward the finish.  Boulmerka celebrated, flexing her muscles while the rest of the field looked exhausted.  A little over a year later, Qu would set the world record that would last for 22 years.

Medalists

Records
These were the standing world and Olympic records (in minutes) prior to the 1992 Summer Olympics.

Final

Semi finals

Heats

See also
 1990 Women's European Championships 1500 metres (Split)
 1991 Women's World Championships 1500 metres (Tokyo)
 1993 Women's World Championships 1500 metres (Stuttgart)
 1994 Women's European Championships 1500 metres (Helsinki)

References

External links
 Official Report
 Results

 
1500 metres at the Olympics
1992 in women's athletics
Women's events at the 1992 Summer Olympics